Juan Luis Maneiro (in Latin, Ioannis Aloisii Maneiro) (2 or 22 February 1744 – 16 November 1802) was a Mexican Jesuit teacher, scholar, biographer, theologian, and poet. After the expulsion of the Jesuits from Spanish provinces (1767), he went to Italy, where he wrote Latin biographies of illustrious Mexican Jesuits.

Biography 

He was born in Veracruz (Mexico) in the home of a Criolla family.

Due to the royal theses of the 10th Count of Arandas, who convinced the King of Spain Carlos III de Borbón y Farnesio to carry out the expulsion of the Jesuits from Spanish provinces, Maneiro had to embark with 24 other companions to set sail from Veracruz in the frigate Jupiter on 25 October 1767, and settled in Bologna, except for a time in Rome (1774–1783). He returned from Bologna to New Spain on 27 August 1799.

While in the Papal States, Maneiro penned biographies of some of his Jesuit colleagues, including Francisco Javier Clavijero and José Rafael Campoy, in Latin, as well as poems, in Spanish.

He received priestly orders in Bologna, on 2 February 1769.

Maneiro died in Mexico City, on 16 November 1802.

References 

1744 births
1802 deaths
Colonial Mexico
Mexican biographers
18th-century Mexican poets
Mexican male writers
Writers from Veracruz
Mexican Jesuits
People from Veracruz (city)
People of New Spain
Jesuit exiles
Mexican exiles
18th-century Mexican writers
18th-century male writers
Jesuits expelled from the Americas